Tursunzoda (Russian and Tajik: Турсунзода, formerly Jarqutan) is a village in Sughd Region, northern Tajikistan. It is part of the jamoat Shahriston in Shahriston District.

References

Populated places in Sughd Region